Syllitus fulvipennis is a species of beetle in the family Cerambycidae. It was described by Gahan in 1893.

References

Stenoderini
Beetles described in 1893